Riccardo Maestri (born 20 April 1994 in Milan) is an Italian swimmer. He competed in the 4 × 200 metre freestyle relay event at the 2012 Summer Olympics.

References

1994 births
Living people
Italian male swimmers
Olympic swimmers of Italy
Swimmers at the 2012 Summer Olympics
Italian male freestyle swimmers
European Aquatics Championships medalists in swimming